Jacques Thomas Sarrut (16 August 1765 – 26 June 1813) joined the French army and became a division commander in the First French Empire of Napoleon. He led a regiment at Hohenlinden, a brigade at Jena, Bussaco, and Fuentes de Oñoro, and a division at Salamanca. He was mortally wounded while leading his soldiers against the Anglo-Allied army at the Battle of Vitoria. Sarrut is one of the names inscribed under the Arc de Triomphe on Column 21.

Revolution
Sarrut was born on 16 August 1765 at Canté in what is now the department of Ariège, France, which is on the border with Spain. He became Chef de Brigade (colonel) of the 3rd Demi-Brigade de bataille on 28 May 1794. He transferred to command of the 8th Infantry Demi-Brigade on 19 February 1796. That year the 8th was serving with the Army of the North, but in 1797 the unit transferred to the Army of Germany. In 1798, the demi-brigade switched between the Army of Mainz, the Army of the Danube, and the Army of the Rhine. At the Battle of Hohenlinden on 3 December 1800, the 8th Demi-Brigade with a strength of 2,680 men was part of Antoine Richepanse's division.

Empire
On 15 July 1811, Sarrut's division of the Army of Portugal counted 4,922 men present. The division consisted of three battalions each of the 2nd Light, 4th Light, and 36th Line Infantry Regiments.

Notes

References

French generals
French military personnel of the French Revolutionary Wars
French military personnel killed in the Napoleonic Wars
French commanders of the Napoleonic Wars
People from Ariège (department)
1765 births
1813 deaths
Names inscribed under the Arc de Triomphe